Hopetoun may refer to:

 Earl of Hopetoun, a courtesy title given to the heir of the Marquess of Linlithgow, head of the Scottish noble family of Hope
 Hopetoun House, an 18-century country house near Queensferry, West Lothian

Places named after the seventh Earl who was the first Governor-General of Australia:
 Hopetoun, Victoria, Australia
 Hopetoun, Western Australia
 Hopetoun Hotel, Sydney, Australia

See also
 Hopeton (disambiguation)
 Hopetown (disambiguation)